Wuhan flu may be:
 an informal term for COVID-19 that is generally associated with xenophobia related to the pandemic
 the name of a song on the 2020 Borat Subsequent Moviefilm